Hubička is a 1911 Austro-Hungarian comedy film.

External links
 

1911 comedy films
1911 films
Austro-Hungarian films
Austrian black-and-white films
Hungarian black-and-white films
Czech comedy films
Hungarian silent films
Austrian silent films
Hungarian comedy films
Austrian comedy films

cs:Kinofa#Hraná tvorba